Buteshire was a county constituency of the House of Commons of the Parliament of Great Britain from 1708 to 1801 and of the Parliament of the United Kingdom from 1801 to 1918.

Creation
The British parliamentary constituency was created in 1708 following the Acts of Union, 1707 and replaced the former Parliament of Scotland shire constituency of Buteshire.

History
From 1708 to 1832 Buteshire and Caithness were paired as alternating constituencies: one of the constituencies elected a Member of Parliament (MP) to one parliament, the other to the next. The areas which were covered by the two constituencies are quite remote from each other, Caithness in the northeast of Scotland and Buteshire in the southwest.

From 1832 to 1918, Buteshire was represented continuously by its own MP.

Boundaries
From 1708 to 1832, the Buteshire constituency covered the county of Bute (which historically included the islands of Arran, Great Cumbrae and Little Cumbrae) minus the parliamentary burgh of Rothesay, which was a component of the Ayr Burghs constituency. In 1832, Rothesay was merged into the Buteshire constituency.

By 1892, Bute had become a local government county and, throughout Scotland, under the Local Government (Scotland) Act 1889, county boundaries had been redefined for all purposes except parliamentary representation. 26 years were to elapse before constituency boundaries were redrawn, by the Representation of the People Act 1918, to take account of new local government boundaries.

In 1918, the Bute and Northern Ayrshire county constituency was created, to cover the county of Bute and a northern portion of the county of Ayr. The rest of the county of Ayr was divided between three other constituencies, all entirely within the county: the county constituencies of South Ayrshire and Kilmarnock, and a remodelled Ayr Burghs.

Members of Parliament

MPs 1708 to 1832

MPs 1832 to 1918

Election results

Elections in the 1830s

For the 1831 election, Caithness returned the MP.

 Considered a 'new seat' as the constituency did not elect an MP in 1831

Stuart resigned, causing a by-election.

Elections in the 1840s

Rae was appointed Lord Advocate, requiring a by-election.

Rae's death caused a by-election.

Stuart-Wortley was appointed Judge Advocate General of the Armed Forces, requiring a by-election.

Elections in the 1850s

Stuart-Wortley was appointed Solicitor General for England and Wales, requiring a by-election.

Elections in the 1860s
Mure's appointment as a Senator of the College of Justice, becoming Lord Mure, caused a by-election.

Elections in the 1870s

Elections in the 1880s

Russell was disqualified due to his holding of a government contract at the time of the election, causing a by-election.

Dalrymple was appointed a Lord Commissioner of the Treasury, requiring a by-election.

Robertson was appointed as Solicitor General for Scotland, requiring a by-election.

Elections in the 1890s

Elections in the 1900s

Elections in the 1910s

References

Sources 

Historic parliamentary constituencies in Scotland (Westminster)
Constituencies of the Parliament of the United Kingdom established in 1708
Constituencies of the Parliament of the United Kingdom disestablished in 1918
Politics of the county of Bute
Politics of Argyll and Bute